Jamaica is competing at the 2013 World Aquatics Championships in Barcelona, Spain between 19 July and 4 August 2013.

Diving

Jamaica qualified a single quota for the following diving events.

Men

Swimming

Jamaican swimmers achieved qualifying standards in the following events (up to a maximum of 2 swimmers in each event at the A-standard entry time, and 1 at the B-standard):

Women

References

External links
Barcelona 2013 Official Site
Amateur Swimming Association of Jamaica web site

Nations at the 2013 World Aquatics Championships
2013 in Jamaican sport
Jamaica at the World Aquatics Championships